James Tylden (26 April 1889 – 24 February 1949) was an English cricketer. He was a left-handed batsman who played first-class cricket for Kent. He was born in Kent and died in Whitechapel.

Tylden, who had represented Kent's Second XI in the Minor Counties Championship since 1920, made his sole first-class appearance against Oxford University in 1923. He was caught out for 19 in the first innings, and for a duck in the second.

Tylden appeared for I Zingari in a twelve-a-side match in 1925. He was a lower-middle order batsman throughout his time with the Second XI and in the first team. Tylden's brother-in-law was William Findlay, who played for County Cricket for Lancashire between 1902 and 1906.

References

1889 births
1949 deaths
English cricketers
Kent cricketers